Okusaru Dam  is a gravity dam located in Hokkaido Prefecture in Japan. The dam is used for power production. The catchment area of the dam is 52 km2. The dam impounds about 7  ha of land when full and can store 530 thousand cubic meters of water. The construction of the dam was started on 1990 and completed in 1994.

References

Dams in Hokkaido